Dian Agus Prasetyo (born 3 August 1985) is an Indonesian professional footballer who plays as a goalkeeper for Liga 2 club PSPS Riau.

Club career
On November 30, 2014, he was signed by Sriwijaya.

Career statistics

International appearances

References

External links
 Dian Agus Prasetyo at Liga Indonesia
 

1985 births
Living people
Sportspeople from East Java
People from Ponorogo Regency
Association football goalkeepers
Indonesian footballers
Liga 1 (Indonesia) players
Arema F.C. players
Pelita Jaya FC players
Indonesian Premier Division players
Persegi Gianyar players
Sriwijaya F.C. players
Footballers at the 2006 Asian Games
Asian Games competitors for Indonesia